Cyanophrys herodotus, the tropical green hairstreak or tropical greenstreak, is a butterfly of the family Lycaenidae. It was described by Johan Christian Fabricius in 1793. It is found in Mexico, Guatemala, Panama, Nicaragua, Colombia, Ecuador, Peru, Bolivia, Brazil, Paraguay and Argentina. Rare strays can be found as far north as southern Texas. The habitat consists of open disturbed areas in tropical and subtropical rainforests and cloudforests at altitudes ranging from 600 to about 2,000 meters.

The wingspan is 22–29 mm. The upperside is blue and the underside is green. The hindwings are tailed and have one red-brown spot at the lower outer margin. Adults are on wing from late May to late October in southern Texas. They are on wing year-round in Central America and Mexico. They feed on flower nectar.

The larvae feed on the leaves and flowers of various shrubs and trees, including Lantana camara, Cornutia grandifolia, Clerodendron paniculatum, Lithraea brasiliensis, Schinus molle, Mangifera indica and Mikania species.

References

 "Cyanophrys herodotus (Fabricius, 1793) (Tropical Greenstreak)". Butterflies of America.

Butterflies described in 1793
Cyanophrys